Bunnaloo Public School is a rural primary school that educates children from years Kindergarten to Year 6 from the Bunnaloo region of New South Wales. Founded in 1928, the school has five classrooms, an oval and a school residence. The principal is Darren Devereux, who came to the school in 1999.

History
The school was established in response to requests from locals to the government for a new school in the area. Following the purchase of land, the first classroom was constructed in late 1927 by Echuca contractors Messrs. Symons & Co. The school opened in January 1928, with W Hester acting as the principal and single teacher of the 25 enrolled students. At this time, the school offered education to students from Years 1 to 8 (14 was the leaving age of school at the time).

In late 1944, the school was closed during the closing stages of World War II due to a luck of the number of students. The school was re-opened in 1951 by Barry Hubbard with borrowed supplies from the local Mathoura Public School. In 1957, the introduction of irrigation brought many people to the area which led to a high number of new enrolments. This led to the construction of a second classroom in 1962, splitting the school into a Lower form (years K,1,2) and an Upper form (years 3,4,5,6). A staffroom that included a telephone was added in 1964. The school residence located South of the oval was built 1967, and a bus run operating to the North of the school was introduced the following year.

A third building was relocated to the school from the former Walliston School in 1976 after the enrolment number rose to 45 students (which would continue to grow to 63 the next year). Student number declined dramatically in 1987, which resulted in the school employing only one teacher. As enrolment numbers increased during the 1990s a new portable classroom was introduced in 1998, only to be replaced by a portable building that included a classroom, office, staffroom and principals office in 2001 (the building has previously been used to house athletes at the 2000 Sydney Olympic Games). This was the fourth building at the school, which included internet access.

A government grant allowed for the construction of a new classroom in 2010, to be used as a new library for the school. The completion of this building in late 2010 allowed it to be used as a Year 5/6 classroom from 2011 onward.

In 2013, the school's senior relay team competed as representatives for the Riverina District and placed 3rd at Sydney's Homebush Athletics Centre. In 2016, the school residence was demolished, leaving only the brick shed for school use.

Principals

Reference:

See also 
 List of schools in New South Wales
 List of Government schools in New South Wales: A–F

References

External links 
 Bunnaloo PS Plan 2015–17

1928 establishments in Australia
Educational institutions established in 1928
Public primary schools in New South Wales
Education in the Riverina